This is a list of the Australian moth species of the family Sphingidae. It also acts as an index to the species articles and forms part of the full List of moths of Australia.

Macroglossinae
Acosmeryx anceus (Stoll, 1781)
Acosmeryx miskini (Murray, 1873)
Angonyx excellens (Rothschild, 1911)
Angonyx papuana Rothschild & Jordan, 1903
Cephonodes hylas (Linnaeus, 1771)
Cephonodes janus (Miskin, 1891)
Cephonodes kingii (W.S. Macleay, 1826)
Cephonodes picus (Cramer, 1777)
Cizara ardeniae (Lewin, 1805)
Daphnis dohertyi Rothschild, 1897
Daphnis hypothous (Cramer, 1780)
Daphnis moorei (W.J. Macleay, 1866)
Daphnis placida (Walker, 1856)
Daphnis protrudens R. Felder, 1874
Eupanacra splendens (Rothschild, 1894)
Gnathothlibus eras (Boisduval, 1832)
Gnathothlibus erotus (Cramer, 1777)
Gnathothlibus australiensis Lachlan, 2004
Hippotion boerhaviae (Fabricius, 1775)
Hippotion brennus (Stoll, 1782)
Hippotion celerio (Linnaeus, 1758)
Hippotion rosetta (Swinhoe, 1892)
Hippotion scrofa (Boisduval, 1832)
Hippotion velox (Fabricius, 1793)
Hyles livornicoides (T.P. Lucas, 1892)
Macroglossum alcedo (Boisduval, 1832)
Macroglossum corythus (Walker, 1856)
Macroglossum dohertyi (Rothschild, 1894)
Macroglossum heliophila (Boisduval, 1875)
Macroglossum hirundo (Boisduval, 1832)
Macroglossum insipida (Butler, 1875)
Macroglossum joannisi Rothschild & Jordan, 1903
Macroglossum micacea (Walker, 1856)
Macroglossum nubilum Rothschild & Jordan, 1903
Macroglossum prometheus (Boisduval, 1875)
Macroglossum rectans Rothschild & Jordan, 1903
Macroglossum tenebrosa (T.P. Lucas, 1891)
Macroglossum vacillans (Walker, 1865)
Nephele hespera (Fabricius, 1775)
Nephele subvaria (Walker, 1856)
Theretra clotho (Drury, 1773)
Theretra indistincta (Butler, 1877)
Theretra inornata (Walker, 1865)
Theretra latreillii (W.S. Macleay, 1826)
Theretra margarita (Kirby, 1877)
Theretra nessus (Drury, 1773)
Theretra oldenlandiae (Fabricius, 1775)
Theretra queenslandi (T.P. Lucas, 1891)
Theretra radiosa Rothschild & Jordan, 1916
Theretra silhetensis (Walker, 1856)
Theretra tryoni (Miskin, 1891)
Theretra turneri (T.P. Lucas, 1891)
Zacria vojtechi Haxaire & Melichar, 2003

Smerinthinae
Ambulyx dohertyi Rothschild, 1894
Ambulyx wildei Miskin, 1891
Coenotes eremophilae (T.P. Lucas, 1891)
Coequosa australasiae (Donovan, 1805)
Coequosa triangularis (Donovan, 1805)
Hopliocnema brachycera (Lower, 1897)
Imber tropicus Moulds, 1983
Synoecha marmorata (T.P. Lucas, 1891)
Tetrachroa edwardsi (Olliff, 1890)

Sphinginae
Agrius convolvuli (Linnaeus, 1758)
Agrius godarti W.S. Macleay, 1826
Leucomonia bethia (Kirby, 1877)
Meganoton rufescens (Butler, 1875)
Psilogramma argos Moulds & Lane, 1999
Psilogramma casuarinae (Walker, 1856) (previously misidentified as Psilogramma menephron (Cramer, 1780))
Psilogramma increta (Walker, 1865)
Psilogramma exigua Brechlin, Lane & Kitching, 2010
Psilogramma koalae Eitschberger, 2001
Psilogramma gloriosa Eitschberger, 2001
Psilogramma maxmouldsi Eitschberger, 2001
Psilogramma nebulosa Butler, 1876
Psilogramma papuensis Brechlin, 2001
Psilogramma penumbra Lane, Moulds & Tuttle, 2011

External links 
Sphingidae at Australian Faunal Directory

Australia